Khadakewadi is a village in the Karmala taluka of Solapur district in Maharashtra state, India.

Demographics
Covering  and comprising 178 households at the time of the 2011 census of India, Khadakewadi had a population of 876. There were 444 males and 432 females, with 92 people being aged six or younger.

References

Villages in Karmala taluka